The 1984 CONCACAF Pre-Olympic Tournament was the sixth edition of the CONCACAF Pre-Olympic Tournament, the quadrennial, international football tournament organised by the CONCACAF to determine which national teams from the North, Central America and Caribbean region qualify for the Olympic football tournament.

As the top two teams, champions,  Costa Rica and Canada qualified for the 1984 Summer Olympics as representatives of CONCACAF.

Qualification

Qualified teams
The following teams qualified for the final tournament.

1 Only final tournament.

Final round

Canada and Costa Rica qualified for the Olympics as a result of this match, and Cuba were eliminated; therefore, the final Cuba v Canada match was scratched.

References 

1984
Oly
Football qualification for the 1984 Summer Olympics